Larix mastersiana is a species of conifer in the family Pinaceae. It is found only in China. It is threatened by habitat loss.

References

External links
Larix mastersiana at eFloras

mastersiana
Vulnerable plants
Trees of China
Endemic flora of China
Taxonomy articles created by Polbot
Deciduous conifers